Forever and a Day is a 1943 American drama film, a collaborative effort employing seven directors/producers and 22 writers, with an enormous cast of well-known stars.

Background
In March 1940 Cedric Hardwicke initiated plans for a movie made without remuneration by British writers, directors and actors/actresses, intended to honor their homeland's spirit and to benefit war relief charities, with RKO Studios financing the production costs of the film with a $300,000 budget: it was estimated that had the film's pro bono participants been salaried the film would have cost $6 million (the actors and actresses appearing in the film were reportedly paid $60 a week as mandated by Equity – their pay may have been routinely donated).

The film – whose first working title was Let The Rafters Ring with This Changing Time and Forever and a Day both later put forward as possibilities – had its original projected completion date of 1 June 1941 negated by the screenplay not being completed until April 1941. W. P. Lipscomb – who was paid $10,000 – wrote this screenplay, reportedly drawing on the brainstorming sessions of a committee of writers musing on a scenario proposed by Robert Stevenson. This scenario, attributed by Stevenson to an unpublished novel he'd written, overtly reprised the scenario of Cavalcade (1933), the first British film to emphatically find favor with the American film industry and moviegoers, which had outlined the personal history of the families resident in a London townhouse within the context of the historical events of 1899 to 1929. To accommodate a large cast of British-born stars Forever and a Day had an extended timespan of 136 years (1804-1940), and was filmed – with minimal advance publicity – in May–December 1941.

The film's first episode – directed by Herbert Wilcox and starring his wife Anna Neagle as well as Ray Milland and Claude Rains – was filmed in two weeks in May 1941, with Neagle and Rains reprising their roles in the second episode completed – under Robert Stevenson's direction – in June. The film was then dormant for several months due to scheduling issues with its projected stars: Ronald Colman and Greer Garson had offered to appear in the film but they were disallowed by MGM from playing the focal couple of the third episode, that studio feeling it would lessen the impact of the upcoming Colman/Garson star vehicle Random Harvest. The episode's director Victor Saville extended an invitation to British stage musical star Jessie Matthews, then in New York City preparing for a Broadway role, to replace Garson (Saville had helmed the most successful films made by Matthews in her homeland in the 1930s): Matthews agreed to film Garson's intended scenes over three days in Hollywood in September 1941, playing opposite Ian Hunter whose services MGM had donated to cover for Colman (Hunter had been Matthews' leading man in one of her lesser films: The Man from Toronto (1933)).

The fourth episode was set to film in the autumn of 1941 after Cary Grant and Alfred Hitchcock – the leading man and director – had completed the film Suspicion: the availability of the episode's leading lady: Ida Lupino, was a non-issue, the actress being on suspension at Warner Bros. When the filming of Suspicion ran overtime preventing both Grant and Hitchcock from filming the fourth episode in September 1941 Brian Aherne replaced Grant as Lupino's leading man, with René Clair replacing Hitchcock as director. Filming on the fifth episode – with Edmund Goulding directing leading players Robert Cummings and Merle Oberon – began 27 November 1941, with the film as originally envisioned completed after the filming day of 1 December 1941: however the 7 December 1941 attack on Pearl Harbor infused in Hardwicke the need to modify the film to reflect the direct involvement in World War II which Pearl Harbor made inevitable. When the film remained incomplete several months into 1942, RKO – who by then had spent $100,000 over the agreed $300,000 production costs budget – insisted the film be "wrapped" and made ready for release, assigning Frank Lloyd to direct Kent Smith and Ruth Warrick – both RKO contract players – in a "framing" segment set in 1941 which would open and close the film also popping up between the second and third episode. It was hoped that Forever and a Day could be released in November 1942: however the film would not be released until March 1943.

Plot
In World War II, American Gates Trimble Pomfret (Kent Smith) is in London during the Blitz to sell the ancestral family house. The current tenant, Lesley Trimble (Ruth Warrick), tries to dissuade him from selling by telling him the 140-year history of the place and the connections between the Trimble and Pomfret families.

Partial cast

Kent Smith as Gates Trimble Pomfret
Reginald Gardiner as Assistant Hotel Manager
Victor McLaglen as Archibald Spavin, hotel doorman
Arthur Treacher as Second Air Raid Watcher
June Lockhart as Girl in Air Raid Shelter
Ruth Warrick as Lesley Trimble
Sir Cedric Hardwicke as Mr. Dabb
Herbert Marshall as Curate in Air Raid Shelter
Charles Irwin as Corporal Charlie
C. Aubrey Smith as Admiral Eustace Trimble
Edmund Gwenn as Stubbs
Lumsden Hare as Fitch
Ray Milland as Lieutenant William Trimble
Dame May Whitty as Mrs. Lucy Trimble
Gene Lockhart as Cobblewick
Anna Neagle as Susan Trenchard
Claud Allister as William Barstow
Alan Edmiston as Tripp, Pomfret's Lawyer
Claude Rains as Ambrose Pomfret
Clifford Severn as Nelson Trimble
Alec Craig as Ambrose Pomfret's Butler
Jessie Matthews as	Mildred Trimble
Reginald Owen as Simpson, solicitor
Ian Hunter as Dexter Pomfret
Charles Laughton as Bellamy, Dexter's butler
Anna Lee as Cornelia Trimble
Buster Keaton as Wilkins, plumber's helper
Montagu Love as Sir John Bunn

Edward Everett Horton as Sir Anthony Trimble-Pomfret
Daphne Moore as Elizabeth Trimble-Pomfret
Patric Knowles as Trimble-Pomfret son
June Duprez as Julia Trimble-Pomfret
Cecil Kellaway as Dinner Guest
Isobel Elsom as Lady Trimble-Pomfret
Ida Lupino as Jenny Jones, the maid
Wendy Barrie as Edith Trimble-Pomfret
Wendell Hulett as Augustus Trimble-Pomfret
Eric Blore as Charles, the butler
Brian Aherne as Jim Trimble
Merle Oberon as Marjorie Ismay
Emily Fitzroy as Mrs. Fulcher
Una O'Connor as Mrs. Caroline Ismay
Richard Haydn as Mr. Butcher
Odette Myrtil as Madame Gaby
Nigel Bruce as Major Garrow
Elsa Lanchester as Mamie, the hotel maid
Ivan F. Simpson as Dexter, the hotel tenant
Anita Sharp-Bolster as Mrs. Garrow
Roland Young as Henry Barringer
Gladys Cooper as Mrs. Barringer
Marta Gale as Miss Garrow
Robert Cummings as Ned Trimble
Donald Crisp as Captain Martin
Doris Lloyd as Trimble Maid  
Helena Pickard as Trimble Maid
Connie Leon as wartime Londoner

Notes

External links

Review in The New York Times by Bosley Crowther (May 13, 1943)

1943 films
1940s English-language films
Battle of Britain films
American black-and-white films
RKO Pictures films
Films directed by Cedric Hardwicke
Films directed by Frank Lloyd
Films directed by Edmund Goulding
Films directed by Victor Saville
Films directed by René Clair
Films directed by Herbert Wilcox
Films directed by Robert Stevenson
1943 drama films
Films with screenplays by Donald Ogden Stewart
Films set in 1804
Films set in 1805
Films set in 1846
Films set in 1847
Films set in 1897
Films set in 1907
Films set in 1917
Films set in 1918
Films set in 1941
Films set in London
Collaborative projects
Napoleonic Wars films
American World War I films
American World War II films
World War II films made in wartime
Films produced by Victor Saville
American drama films